"Go Wild in the Country" is a single by English new wave band Bow Wow Wow from their album See Jungle! See Jungle! Go Join Your Gang Yeah, City All Over! Go Ape Crazy!. Released in January 1982 by RCA Records, it was their first top 10 hit on the UK Singles Chart.

Composition
"Go Wild in the Country" was written by Malcolm McLaren with band members Matthew Ashman, Dave Barbarossa and Leigh Gorman. Produced by Brian Tench, it was Bow Wow Wow's first single not be produced by McLaren.

Release
The January 1982 release of "Go Wild in the Country" coincided with McLaren's "Nostalgia of Mud" phase, in which he intended "to show in clothes and music that, in the post-industrial age, the roots of our culture lie in primitive societies". Its lyrics convey many of the themes of this ideology, with references to disdain for town life, lonely streets and takeaway food, and a desire to go "wild in the country/where snakes in the grass are absolutely free".

Bow Wow Wow made their first appearance on Top of the Pops on 11 February 1982, performing "Go Wild in the Country", with lead singer Annabella Lwin debuting her trademark mohawk hairdo. The song remained on the UK Singles Chart for 13 weeks, peaking  at No. 7. The B-side was the instrumental "El Boss Dicho!"

Cover
The single sleeve featured the band's recreation of Édouard Manet’s Le Déjeuner sur l'herbe. The photograph, taken by Andy Earl, caused controversy when it was originally used for the cover of See Jungle! See Jungle! Go Join Your Gang Yeah, City All Over! Go Ape Crazy!, as Lwin was just 14 years old at the time of the album's release. The image was re-used for their follow-up EP The Last of the Mohicans, and in 2003 for the Castle Music two-disc anthology, I Want Candy.

References

External links

1982 songs
Bow Wow Wow songs
1982 singles
RCA Records singles
Songs written by Malcolm McLaren